Yuri Aleksandrovich Sevidov (24 August 1942 – 11 February 2010) was a Soviet footballer.

Career
Born in Moscow, the son of the famous Soviet football player and manager, Aleksandr Sevidov, Yuri began playing professional football with FC Spartak Moscow at age 18. Sevidov twice won the Soviet Cup (in 1963 and 1965) and the Soviet Top League (in 1962, when he scored 16 league goals).

He was the best bombardier of 1962 Soviet championship. He is gold champion of USSR in 1962 and bronze medalist in 1961.

Personal life
In 1965 while driving a car, Sevidov hit a man who was a corresponding member of the USSR Academy of Sciences Dmitry Ryabchikov, the prominent chemist, winner of the Stalin Prize and who died soon at hospital as a result of medical mistake. Sevidov was sentenced to ten years in prison and was deprived of the title of master of sports. He was paroled after four years in custody. Yuri was the son of Aleksandr Sevidov.

After retirement
In recent years, Yuri Sevidov worked as a columnist for the Soviet sport and often acted as an expert in sports programs on TV.

Death
On 11 February 2010, Sevidov died during a business trip in Marbella, Spain.

References

1942 births
2010 deaths
Russian footballers
Soviet footballers
Olympic footballers of the Soviet Union
Soviet football managers
FC Zimbru Chișinău players
FC Spartak Moscow players
FC Kairat players
FC Shakhtar Donetsk players
Soviet Top League players
FC Shinnik Yaroslavl managers
Association football forwards
FC Spartak Ryazan players